The Bachelor and the Bobby-Soxer (released as Bachelor Knight in the United Kingdom) is a 1947 American screwball romantic comedy-drama film directed by Irving Reis and written by Sidney Sheldon. The film stars Cary Grant, Myrna Loy, and Shirley Temple in a story about a teenager's crush on an older man.

Upon its release, The Bachelor and the Bobby-Soxer was well received by both audiences and critics. Sidney Sheldon won an Academy Award for Best Original Screenplay for this film.

Plot
Margaret Turner (Myrna Loy) and Susan Turner (Shirley Temple) are sisters who live together. Susan is an intelligent 17-year-old high-school student with a habit of forming short-lived interests after hearing the regular guest lectures at school. Margaret is a judge, and Susan's guardian.

Richard Nugent (Cary Grant), a handsome and sophisticated artist, is a defendant in Margaret's courtroom, charged by ADA Tommy Chamberlain (Rudy Vallee) with starting a nightclub brawl. She releases him with a warning when it becomes clear that the fight was started by two women fighting over him.

He proceeds to Susan's school, where he is the guest lecturer for the day—and as he speaks, Susan becomes infatuated with him. After the talk she finds a reason to spend time with him and suggests she model for him; that evening, she puts on a sophisticated dress and sneaks away from home and into his apartment while he is out.

Richard has no sooner discovered Susan in his apartment than Tommy and Margaret arrive to rescue her from his presumed seduction. Richard assaults Tommy and is held in jail until Matt Beemish (Ray Collins), who is the court psychiatrist and also Margaret and Susan's uncle, intervenes and explains the true situation. He recommends allowing Susan to date Richard until the infatuation burns itself out; Tommy will drop the assault charge if Richard complies.

At a high-school basketball game, Richard tries unsuccessfully to boost Susan's image of Jerry White (Johnny Sands), the boyfriend she dumped for him. Later, at a school picnic, Susan persuades Richard to enter a series of novelty races (open to adult family members), where he loses repeatedly to Tommy. But in the main event, an obstacle course, she asks Jerry to help Richard win. Because he still loves her, Jerry complies, helping him directly at one point, then colliding with Tommy so that Richard does win the event.

Meanwhile, Richard and Margaret are becoming attracted to each other, to the discomfiture of Tommy, who sees Richard as a habitual troublemaker and wants Margaret for himself. Hoping Richard will stop seeing Margaret if he no longer has to date Susan, Tommy announces he is dropping the charge. But Richard and Margaret go out to a nightclub, where they are interrupted in succession by all the other main characters as well as a former girlfriend of Richard's. They all part angrily. Susan accuses Margaret of stealing her boyfriend from her. Matt gets Susan to see that she is only infatuated with Richard and that Richard is too old for her.

Afterwards, though, Matt is able to talk sense into Susan, and she returns to Jerry.  Matt finds out that Richard has decided to take a trip and is able to manipulate affairs so that Margaret will travel with him. Learning that Tommy is coming to arrest Richard on trumped-up charges, Matt forestalls him by telling police at the airport that Tommy is a mental patient with delusions of being an assistant district attorney. Richard and Margaret are happily surprised to meet each other as they approach the plane to board thanks to Matt's manipulation

Cast

 Cary Grant as Richard Nugent, a sophisticated bachelor
 Myrna Loy as Margaret Turner, a judge
 Shirley Temple as Susan Turner, her teenage sister
 Rudy Vallée as Tommy Chamberlain, an assistant district attorney
 Ray Collins as Dr. Matt Beemish, a psychiatrist and Margaret and Susan's uncle
 Harry Davenport as Judge Thaddeus Turner, Margaret and Susan's great uncle
 Johnny Sands as Jerry White, Susan's teenage boyfriend
 Don Beddoe as Joey
 Lillian Randolph as Bessie
 Veda Ann Borg as Agnes Prescott
 Dan Tobin as Walters
 Ransom M. Sherman as Judge Treadwell
 William Bakewell as Winters
 Irving Bacon as Melvin
 Ian Bernard as Perry
 Carol Hughes as Florence
 William Hall as Anthony Herman
 Gregory Gaye as Maitre d'Hotel (credited as Gregory Gay)
 Pat Flaherty as Sunset High Coach (uncredited)

Reception
The New York Times thought the film "most agreeable" with high praise for the four principal performers, the direction and screenplay.

The film's screenplay won an Academy Award (Best Original Screenplay) for Sidney Sheldon, who went on to create I Dream of Jeannie, Hart to Hart, and, as a novelist, Master of the Game (1982), The Other Side of Midnight (1973), and Rage of Angels (1980).

According to RKO records, the film earned $4,200,000 in theater rentals in the U.S. and Canada and $1,350,000 elsewhere, resulting in a profit of $700,000.

Home media
In 2009, the film was available on videocassette and DVD.

Radio adaptation
It was dramatized as a half-hour radio play on the May 10, 1948 broadcast of The Screen Guild Theater with Cary Grant, Myrna Loy and Shirley Temple. It was also dramatized as a Lux Radio Theater adaptation starring Cary Grant and Shirley Temple that aired on June 13, 1949.

In popular culture
David Bowie's song "Magic Dance", which appears in the 1986 film Labyrinth, includes lyrics that refer to Cary Grant and Shirley Temple's call and reply dialogue heard in the film: "You remind me of a man." "What man?" "The man with the power." "What power?" "The power of hoodoo." "Who do?" "You do!". In "Magic Dance", "man" is replaced with "babe" and "hoodoo" with "voodoo".

See also
 Shirley Temple filmography

References

External links
 
 
 
 
 
 The Bachelor and the Bobby-Soxer Review at The Ultimate Cary Grant Pages
 Radio adaptation of The Bachelor and the Bobby-Soxer June 13, 1949 on Lux Radio Theater; 60 minutes, with Cary Grant and Shirley Temple (MP3)

1940s American films
1940s screwball comedy films
1947 films
1947 romantic comedy films
American black-and-white films
American screwball comedy films
American romantic comedy films
Fictional couples
Films about lawyers
Films directed by Irving Reis
Films scored by Leigh Harline
Films whose writer won the Best Original Screenplay Academy Award
Films with screenplays by Sidney Sheldon
RKO Pictures films
1940s English-language films